John Spafford Harris (December 18, 1825January 25, 1906) was an American politician for the state of Louisiana and member of  the Republican Party. Born to a farm family in Truxton, New York, Harris was a delegate to the Louisiana state constitutional convention in 1868. He was a member of Louisiana State Senate in 1868 and the first Republican U.S. Senator from Louisiana, having served from 1868 to 1871. Harris was buried at Forestvale Cemetery in Helena, Montana.

Education
Harris attended the common schools, and received some college education during his time in Milwaukee, Wisconsin.

Career
After the death of his mother, Harris accompanied his father to Milwaukee, Wisconsin, in 1846. Initially employed as clerk in a mercantile establishment, he worked as a merchant, real estate dealer, and banker. He eventually rose to be president of Milwaukee's Marine Bank.

In the fall of 1863, traveled to Memphis, Tennessee but found it strictly blockaded by federal authorities.  Consequently, he resolved to return home via New Orleans and New York. An accident happened and his boat was detained in Natchez, Mississippi, where he was induced to lease one of the largest cotton plantations in Louisiana. By the end of the American Civil War had become one of the biggest planters in Louisiana.

He became increasingly involved in politics by organizing local freedmen into clubs and instructing them about their new political rights. As a member of the Republican Party, he took a moderate course, and was seen by the New Orleans Picayune as "one of the mildest and most temperate Republicans." Although the New Orleans Republican noted that he was an abolitionist. He was sworn in as a state senator on June 29, 1868. Nine days later, he was nominated to serve as a US senator for the short term ending in 1871. He succeeded Judah P. Benjamin who had withdrawn from the Senate previous to the war. His nomination was confirmed by both houses. He completed his term on March 3, 1871.

Harris was appointed surveyor general for the state of Montana by President Chester Arthur in 1881.

Death
Harris died in Butte, Montana on  January 25, 1906, and is buried in Helena, Montana.

References

1825 births
1906 deaths
Republican Party Louisiana state senators
Republican Party United States senators from Louisiana
People from Truxton, New York
19th-century American politicians